Brandon Raymond James Prust (born March 16, 1984) is a Canadian former professional ice hockey left winger. Prust was drafted in the third round, 70th overall, by the Calgary Flames in the 2004 NHL Entry Draft, and has played in the NHL for the Flames, Phoenix Coyotes, New York Rangers, Montreal Canadiens and Vancouver Canucks. Prust was best known for his role as an enforcer.

Playing career

Amateur
Prust played three seasons of major junior hockey with his home town London Knights of the Ontario Hockey League (OHL). During his junior career, he won an OHL and Memorial Cup Championship. A Thorndale, Ontario, native, Prust was a walk-on during the Knights' open tryouts, having been bypassed in the OHL Priority Draft.

Professional
Prust was drafted by the Calgary Flames in the third round, 70th overall, at the 2004 NHL Entry Draft. He was sent back down to London to play his final OHL season. After spending the following season with the Omaha Ak-Sar-Ben Knights, Prust made his NHL debut on November 1, 2006, against the Detroit Red Wings.

Prust suffered an injury during the 2008–09 season when he broke his jaw after being elbowed by Cam Janssen of the St. Louis Blues. On March 4, 2009, Prust was traded, along with Matthew Lombardi and a 2009 first-round draft pick, to the Phoenix Coyotes in exchange for Olli Jokinen, and was then traded back to Calgary in exchange for Jim Vandermeer on June 27.

On February 1, 2010, Prust, along with Olli Jokinen, were traded to the New York Rangers in exchange for Aleš Kotalík and Chris Higgins. The Rangers re-signed Prust to a two-year, $1.6 million contract after the end of that season, 2009–10, on July 3.

In the 2010–11 season, Prust, a fourth-line utility player and occasional enforcer, was one of only seven NHL players to score at least ten goals as well as engage in at least ten fights. He was awarded the Steven McDonald Extra Effort Award at the end of the season, given to the Rangers player who "goes above and beyond the call of duty" as voted on by the fans.

Prust also played as the Rangers faced the Philadelphia Flyers in the 2012 NHL Winter Classic, which took place at Citizens Bank Park, Philadelphia, on January 2, 2012. Prust posted two assists in a 3–2 Rangers win. Prust proved to be a valuable member of the Rangers' penalty kill during his tenure there. Prust became a free agent at the end of the season and signed a four-year, $10 million contract with the Montreal Canadiens on July 1, 2012.

After the start of the lock-out-shortened 2012–13 season, Prust scored his first goal as a Canadien against Martin Brodeur of the New Jersey Devils on January 27, 2013. Prust was awarded the Jacques-Beauchamp Trophy at the end of the regular season, an award voted on by the members of the media in Montreal to honour the team's unsung hero.

During the 2014 Eastern Conference Finals against his former team, the New York Rangers, Prust was suspended for two games following a hit on Rangers forward Derek Stepan during the first period of Game 3. Stepan suffered a broken jaw on the play and subsequently missed Game 4.

On July 1, 2015, Prust was traded to the Vancouver Canucks for Zack Kassian and Vancouver's 5th round draft pick in the 2016 NHL Entry Draft. Prust struggled with the Canucks, putting up the fewest points since his rookie 2008–09 season. On February 2, 2016, he was waived by the Canucks and subsequently after clearing waivers, was sent down to the Canucks' AHL affiliate the Utica Comets. On March 10, he returned to his home in London, ON, and was taken off the roster due to an ankle injury. He became an unrestricted free agent on July 1, 2016, after the Canucks declined to re-sign him.

Due to his ankle injury, teams were unwilling to give Prust a contract, with concerns continuing to be raised over his foot speed and ankle itself. Going unsigned for the duration of the summer, he agreed to sign a Professional Try Out contract with the Toronto Maple Leafs on August 22, 2016. Prust's main reason for signing the try out was to fulfil his childhood dream of playing for the Maple Leafs, the team he grew up cheering for. After an unremarkable training camp, along with stiff competition for role players on the Leafs roster, he was released by the team on October 11, 2016, He then embarked on his first overseas stint and European professional experience in late November 2016 after signing with the Thomas Sabo Ice Tigers of the German top-flight Deutsche Eishockey Liga (DEL). In the 2016-17 season, Prust added a needed physical presence to the Ice Tigers, contributing 8 points in 29 games with the team.

As a result of the Ice Tigers' lack of interest in re-signing Prust, coupled with his disinterest in playing overseas, once again as a free agent, Prust opted to return for another attempt at an NHL comeback in signing a professional try-out contract to attend the Los Angeles Kings training camp on August 4, 2017.  After attending Kings camp for 10 days, Prust along with Shane Harper were the first to be released from their PTO with Los Angeles on September 25, 2017.

On November 29, 2017, Prust signalled the conclusion of his 12-year professional career in joining his former major junior club, the London Knights, as a coach. Although Prust did not formally announce his retirement from professional hockey, his role as mentor and coach to the London Knights proved useful over the 2017–18 season and he was reported to be continuing in the position.

On June 4, 2018, via Instagram, Prust announced that he had begun working at the financial guidance firm Navigator Financial.

Personal life
Prust grew up in London, Ontario, where he attended Regina Mundi Catholic College. While there, he excelled in multiple sports, and was recognized as the outstanding student athlete in 2000–01 school year. The number 8 he wore with the Canadiens is the same number he wore as a football player in high school. His favourite team growing up was the Toronto Maple Leafs, and his favourite player was Wendel Clark, after whom he has tried to model his game.

Prust has an uncle who was a Broadway actor. His interests other than hockey include golf and watching baseball.

Prust began dating Montreal TV host Maripier Morin in 2010. On June 22, 2015, the couple got engaged, and married in 2017. Morin has been a cast member on three seasons of the Canadian reality series Hockey Wives and is a popular host of her own talk show in Quebec, as well as starring in her first French-language feature-length film. It was announced September 7, 2019 that the couple had separated.

In 2020 Prust's charitable foundation launched a campaign to raise money for families of sick children to find accommodations in London during the COVID-19 pandemic.

Career statistics

References

External links

1984 births
Living people
Calgary Flames draft picks
Calgary Flames players
Canadian ice hockey left wingers
Ice hockey people from Ontario
London Knights players
Montreal Canadiens players
New York Rangers players
Omaha Ak-Sar-Ben Knights players
Phoenix Coyotes players
Quad City Flames players
Sportspeople from London, Ontario
Thomas Sabo Ice Tigers players
Utica Comets players
Vancouver Canucks players
Canadian expatriate ice hockey players in Germany